Shams al-Dīn Abū ʿAbd Allāh Muḥammad ibn Muḥammad al-Khalīlī (1320–1380) was a Mamluk-era Syrian astronomer who compiled astronomical tables.

Little is known about his life.

Work
Al-Khalili is known for two sets of mathematical tables he constructed, both totalling roughly 30,000 entries. He tabulated all the entries made by the celebrated Egyptian Muslim astronomer Ibn Yunus, except for the entries that al-Khalili made himself for the city of Damascus. He computed 13,000 entries into his 'Universal Tables' of different auxiliary functions which allowed him to generate the solutions of standard problems of spherical astronomy for any given latitude. The values present in al-Khalili’s tables have been determined to be accurate up to three or four significant figures. It is not known how exactly al-Khalili went about calculating each of his entries.

Notes

References

Sources

Further reading
 (PDF version)
 
 
 

1320 births
1380 deaths
People from Damascus
Medieval Syrian astronomers
Astronomers of the medieval Islamic world
Medieval Syrian mathematicians
Scientists who worked on qibla determination
14th-century astronomers
14th-century astrologers
Scholars from the Mamluk Sultanate
14th-century Arabs
14th-century Syrian people